Honezovice is a municipality and village in Plzeň-South District in the Plzeň Region of the Czech Republic. It has about 300 inhabitants.

Administrative parts
The village of Hradišťany is an administrative part of Honezovice.

References

Villages in Plzeň-South District